Pierre-Paul-Désiré Siraudin (18 December 1812 – 8 September 1883) was a French playwright and librettist.

He also used the pen names Paul de Siraudin de Sancy, Paul Siraudin de Sancy and M. Malperché.

Biography 
He wrote many plays, mainly comedies and vaudevilles written in collaboration, notably with Alfred Delacour and Lambert-Thiboust. He also authored librettos for successful operettas and opéras-comiques, including La fille de Madame Angot (1872) in collaboration with Clairville and Victor Koning with music by Charles Lecocq.

In 1860, Siraudin opened a confectionery shop — the Maison Siraudin — at the corner of the Rue de la Paix and the Place Vendôme. Siraudin's sweets were "renowned all the world over"; for example, Siraudin's Perles des Pyrénées ("Pearls of the Pyrenees"), consisting of perfumed sugar, are mentioned in Joris-Karl Huysmans' novel À rebours (1884).

Works 
 1842: La Vendetta with Dumanoir, Théâtre des Variétés 
 1849: E. H. with Eugène Moreau and Alfred Delacour, Théâtre Montansier (7 April)
 1850: Le Courrier de Lyon by Eugène Moreau, Paul Siraudin and Alfred Delacour, Théâtre de la Gaîté
 1852: Le Misanthrope et l'Auvergnat by Eugène Labiche, Paul Siraudin and Lubize, Théâtre du Palais-Royal  
 1853: Le Bourreau des crânes by Paul Siraudin and Édouard Lafargue, Théâtre du Palais-Royal  
 1855: Un bal d'auvergnats by Paul Siraudin, Alfred Delacour and Lambert-Thiboust, Théâtre du Palais-Royal
 1856: La Queue de la poële by Paul Siraudin and Alfred Delacour, Théâtre du Palais-Royal
 1858: Le Fils de la belle au bois dormant by Lambert-Thiboust, Paul Siraudin and Adolphe Choler, Théâtre du Palais-Royal 
 1860: La Pénélope normande by Alphonse Karr, Paul Siraudin and Lambert-Thiboust, Théâtre du Vaudeville  
 1860: La Pénélope à la mode de Caen by Eugène Grangé, Paul Siraudin and Lambert-Thiboust, Théâtre du Palais-Royal 
 1860: La Fille du diable by Clairville, Paul Siraudin and Lambert-Thiboust, Théâtre des Variétés
 1860: Le Favori de la favorite by Paul Siraudin and Auguste Villemot, Théâtre de Baden-Baden
 1864: Les Femmes sérieuses and Paul Siraudin, Alfred Delacour and Ernest Blum, Théâtre du Palais-Royal
 1869: Le Mot de la fin by Clairville and Paul Siraudin, Théâtre des Variétés
 1869: Paris-Revue by Clairville, Paul Siraudin and William Busnach, Théâtre du Chatelet
 1872: La Revue n'est pas au coin du quai by Paul Siraudin, Victor Koning and Clairville, Théâtre des Variétés
 1873: La fille de Madame Angot de Paul Siraudin, Clairville and Victor Koning, music by Charles Lecocq, Théâtre des Folies Dramatiques  
 1875: La Revue à la vapeur by Paul Siraudin, Henri Blondeau and Hector Monréal, Théâtre des Variétés

References 

19th-century French dramatists and playwrights
Confectioners
French opera librettists
1812 births
1883 deaths
Writers from Paris